The Sumrie Better-Ball was a professional golf tournament played from 1969 to 1978. It was a 72-hole better-ball stroke-play event. It was played at Pannal in 1969 and 1970 and then at Blairgowrie in 1972 and 1973. From 1974 it was called the Sumrie-Bournemouth Better-Ball and was played at Queen's Park Golf Club, Bournemouth, England. The tournament was sponsored by Sumrie Clothes who has previously supported the Sumrie Tournament in 1968.

Winners

References

Golf tournaments in England
Team golf tournaments
Recurring events established in 1969
Recurring events disestablished in 1978